The men's team foil was one of eight fencing events on the fencing at the 1972 Summer Olympics programme. It was the thirteenth appearance of the event. The competition was held from 1 to 2 September 1972. 63 fencers from 13 nations competed.

Rosters

Results

Round 1

Round 1 Pool A 

West Germany and Poland each defeated Italy, 12–4 and 11–5, respectively. The two victors then faced off. West Germany won 8–7, with a 61–55 touches advantage making the final bout irrelevant.

Round 1 Pool B 

Cuba and France each defeated Great Britain, 11–5 and 10–6, respectively. The two victors then faced off. France won 9–1.

Round 1 Pool C 

Japan and the Soviet Union each defeated United States 12–4. The two victors then faced off. Japan won 9–7.

Round 1 Pool D 

In the first set of matches, Hungary defeated Lebanon 13–3 and Romania shut out Canada 16–0. In the second, Hungary beat Canada 13–3 and Romania won over Lebanon 9–7. Canada and Lebanon were eliminated and did not face each other; Hungary and Romania vied for position within the group, with Hungary winning 8–7 (with a 62–55 touches advantage making the 16th bout unnecessary).

Elimination rounds

References

Foil team
Men's events at the 1972 Summer Olympics